Stanislav Ivanovich Pozhlakov (4 January 1937 –  26 September 2003) was a Russian jazz musician, composer and performer. He was a member of the Saint Petersburg Union of Composers and received the title of Honored Art Worker of Russia.

His songs were extremely popular and included in repertoire of Soviet music leading singers, such as Edita Piekha, Eduard Khil, Lyudmila Senchina, Muslim Magomayev, Maya Kristalinskaya, Aida Vedishcheva, Galina Nenasheva, Maria Pakhomenko, Tamara Miansarova, Larisa Mondrus and many others. Often the author performed his songs by himself.

References

External links
 Биография С. Пожлакова, Popsa.info
 Они сидели за одной партой. И умерли в один день…

Popular songs
 Guys of the 70th Latitude
 Lullaby with Four Rains
 Song About a Good Man
 At the Pier
 Step Forward

1937 births
2003 deaths
People from Mytishchi
Soviet composers
Soviet male composers
Russian composers
Russian male composers
Russian jazz musicians
Russian jazz composers
20th-century Russian male musicians
20th-century jazz composers